Robin Haase and Matwé Middelkoop were the defending champions, but chose to compete in Doha instead.

Rohan Bopanna and Divij Sharan won the title, defeating Luke Bambridge and Jonny O'Mara in the final, 6–3, 6–4.

Seeds

Draw

Draw

References
Main Draw

Doubles
Maharashtra Open
2019 ATP Tour